Force of Will is a trading card game by Force of Will Co., Ltd. It was first released in Japan in December 2012 as フォースオブウィル and later released to English speaking countries in 2013. It has game mechanics similar to Magic: The Gathering. The game has a tournament circuit.

Game overview
Each player is in control of a main deck of 40–60 cards composed of resonators ("creatures"), chants ("spells"), additions and regalia. They win the game by either reducing their opponents' life points to zero or less, or if the opponent is unable to draw a card when required. As a resource the games uses "Will" which is usually produced by "Magic Stone" - cards who are stored in a separate pile of cards called the "Magic Stone Deck". A special type of card is the "Ruler"/"J-Ruler", a special creature card in the "Ruler Zone". The ruler can be “rested” to call a Magic Stone from the Deck or it can enter the regular field for combat by using the "Judgment" Ability.

Story
The story of Force of Will is printed in the lore of its cards and also written on several sites in different languages. It is a high fantasy story with many references to myths, fairy tales, and history. For example a main protagonist of the story is Grimm, named after the Brothers Grimm and a main antagonist is Nyarlathotep, a reference to a being from the works of H.P. Lovecraft.

Availability
As a collectible card game Force of Will is sold in booster boxes and pre-structured decks and collections who are separated into clusters. Only the two newest clusters of booster boxes are legal in standard play. The older ones are legal for "Wanderer Format". A booster box contains a number of packs with randomized cards, while the pre-structured decks and collections are set with a fixed amount of cards of a specific type. Cards come in different rarities and versions. The rarity can differ from "common" to "super rare" and a special rarity for "Ruler Cards". The number of versions differs from cluster to cluster. Versions of the same card can be full-art, foil or monochrome. Some cards are also given away as promotions and they often have different artwork from the original card.

Cluster and sets 
The following series have already been published:

 Grimm-Cluster
 CMF: Crimson Moon's Fairy Tale
 TAT: The Castle of Heaven and the Two Towers
 MPR: The Moon Priestess Returns
 MOA: The Millennia of Ages
 Alice-Cluster
 SKL: The Seven Kings of the Lands
 TTW: The Twilight Wanderer
 TMS: The Moonlit Savior
 BFA: Battle for Attoractia
 Lapis-Cluster
 CFC: Curse of the Frozen Casket
 LEL: Legacy Lost
 RDE: Return of the Dragon Emperor
 ENW: Echoes of the New World
 Reiya-Cluster
 ACN: Ancient Nights
 ADK: Advent of the Demon King
 TSW: The Time Spinning Witch
 WOM: Winds of the Ominous Moon
New-Valhalla-Cluster
NDR: New Dawn Rises
SVN: The Strangers of New Valhalla
AOA: Awakening of the Ancients
DBV: The Decisive Battle of Valhalla
Alice-Origin-Cluster
AO1: Alice Origin 1
AO2: Alice Origin 2
AO3: Alice Origin 3
AO4: Prologue of Attoractia
Saga-Cluster
EDL: The Epic of the Dragon Lord
MSW: The Magic Stone War - Zero

References

External links
 

Collectible card games
Card games introduced in 2012